Michael Hurley may refer to:

 Michael Hurley (Australian footballer) (born 1990), Australian rules footballer
 Michael Hurley (Gaelic footballer), Irish Gaelic footballer
 Michael Hurley (Jesuit) (1923–2011), Irish Jesuit priest and theologian
 Michael Hurley (musician) (born 1941), American singer/guitarist
 Michael Hurley (19th-century priest) (1780–1837), Augustinian priest
 Michael D. Hurley (born 1976), British literary critic
 Michael J. Hurley, Irish author and historian from Baldoyle, County Dublin
 Myke Hurley, British podcaster

See also 
 Andrew Michael Hurley (born 1975), British writer
 
 Hurley (surname)